Long Live the Republic! is a 1965 Czechoslovak film directed by Karel Kachyňa and written by Jan Procházka. Set in a Moravian village in 1945, it follows a story of a 12-year-old boy named Piňda.

Cast
Zdeněk Lstibůrek as Oldřich Vařeka called Piňda
Naděžda Gajerová as Oldřich's mother
Vlado Müller as Oldřich's father
Gustáv Valach as Cyril Vitlich
Yuriy Nazarov as Soviet officer
Iva Janžurová as Bertýna Petrželová
Jindra Rathová as Vitlich's wife
Jaroslava Vysloužilová as Veverka
Eduard Bredun as Russian soldier Vasily
Jiří Chmelař as Vašák

Awards
1965 San Sebastián Film Festival Best film in International Competition
1965 San Sebastián Film Festival FIPRESCI Prize

References

External links
 

1965 films
Czechoslovak drama films
1960s Czech-language films
Czech black-and-white films
1960s Czech films